Brachydactyly type D, also known as short thumb or stub thumb and inaccurately referred to as clubbed thumb, is a condition clinically recognised by a thumb being relatively short and round with an accompanying wider nail bed. The distal phalanx of affected thumbs is approximately two-thirds the length of full-length thumbs. It is the most common type of brachydactyly, or shortness of digits, affecting approximately 2–3% of the population, and is associated with the HOXD13 gene, located on chromosome 2q31.1

Physiology 
Brachydactyly type D is a skeletal condition which exhibits a 'partial fusion or premature closing of the epiphysis with the distal phalanx of the thumb', according to Goodman et alia (1965). J.K. Breithenbecher (1923) found that distal phalanges of stub thumbs were one-half the length of full-length thumbs, while R.M. Stecher (1957) claimed that it is approximately two-thirds. The condition may either be unilateral (affecting one thumb) or bilateral (affecting both).

Genetics 
A genetic trait, brachydactyly type D exhibits autosomal dominance and is commonly developed or inherited independently of other hereditary traits. The condition is associated with the HOXD13 gene, which is central in digital formation and growth.

Various other studies supported an autosomal dominant pattern with reduced penetrance.

Hereditary trait 
A 1965 scientific study in Israel found that 3.05% of Israeli Arabs had one or two stub thumbs, compared with 1.57% among Ashkenazi as well as non-Ashkenazi Jews. However, as the survey's Arab test persons were mainly recruited from a handful of large and closely related clans living in a particular village, said percentage should be "considered with some reservation," according to Goodman et al. (1965).

Cases of stub thumbs have also been found in Eastern Nepal for Jirel ethnic individuals from their participation in various epidemiologic studies. Some studies included taking radiographs of hands and wrists to examine their skeletal structure. Of the studied sample (which included 2,130 participants; 969 male and 1,161 female), 3.55% were found to have brachydactyly type D.

Terminology 
The condition is known under numerous names. The most commonly used name is clubbed thumb, or club thumb. American researcher R.A. Hefner used the terms "short thumb" and "brachymegalodactylism" in 1924, and "short thumb" has continued to be used in a few other studies since then, including the study that defined Rubinstein–Taybi syndrome in 1963. "Stub thumb" is the common term preferred by the online database Online Mendelian Inheritance in Man and was first used in a 1965 study. Stub thumbs have also been called murderer's thumb (allegedly among fortune tellers), bohemian thumb, toe thumb, and potter's thumb.

The term "clubbed thumb" should not be confused with nail clubbing, which is a clinical sign associated with a number of diseases.

References 

Fingers
Irregular bones